Ramin Taheri is an Iranian Greco-Roman wrestler. He presented in the 87 kg event at the 2021 World Wrestling Championships held in Oslo, Norway.

He won 3 gold medals in Asian Wrestling Championships.

References

External links 
 

Living people
1994 births
People from Izeh
Iranian male sport wrestlers
Asian Wrestling Championships medalists
Sportspeople from Khuzestan province
20th-century Iranian people
21st-century Iranian people
Islamic Solidarity Games competitors for Iran